Trap-jaw ant may refer to:

Odontomachus, most prominent genus of trap-jaw ant.
Anochetus, species of tropical ant.  
Haidomyrmecini, extinct tribe of ant. 
Acanthognathus, Central and South American genus of ant.